WBSB may refer to:

 WBSB (FM), a radio station (89.5 FM) licensed to Anderson, Indiana, United States.
 WZFT, a radio station (104.3 FM) licensed to Baltimore, Maryland, United States, which held the call sign WBSB from 1980 to 1993.
 World Buddhist Scout Brotherhood.
 The ICAO airport code for Brunei International Airport.